Duan Weihong (pinyin: Duàn Wěihóng; b. December 29, 1966), also known as Whitney Duan, is a Chinese billionaire who is currently missing and believed to be held captive by Chinese government investigators on corruption charges. Prior to her arrest at Beijing’s Bulgari Hotel she owned, she was subject to a travel ban by the Chinese government. According to a 2018 report from The New York Times, Duan was detained in 2017, possibly in relation to an anti-corruption investigation into Sun Zhengcai, but there has been no official acknowledgement from the Chinese government.

Duan, who was reported to be one of China’s wealthiest women, was known for her business dealings with former Chinese premier Wen Jiabao and particularly his wife, Zhang Peili. In a memoir written by her ex-husband Desmond Shum titled Red Roulette, Duan is said to have fallen victim to the party’s use of "extralegal kidnappings" to facilitate opaque investigations. However in the book Shum states that arresting and holding suspected high-level criminals for unlimited time is legal in China; this especially applies to Communist Party members suspected of corruption by party investigators. In an interview with NPR, Shum stated that he had received a call from Duan urging him not to publish his book, a request that he said was made under duress.

See also 
 Jack Ma
 List of people who disappeared
 Ren Zhiqiang
 Sun Dawu

References 

1968 births
2010s missing person cases
21st-century Chinese businesswomen
21st-century Chinese businesspeople
Chinese billionaires
Chinese prisoners and detainees
Enforced disappearances in China
Female billionaires
Living people
Missing people
Missing person cases in China